Villecey-sur-Mad (literally Villecey on Mad) is a commune in the Meurthe-et-Moselle department in north-eastern France.

Geography
The village lies on the right bank of the Rupt de Mad, which forms the commune's north-western border.

See also
Communes of the Meurthe-et-Moselle department
Parc naturel régional de Lorraine

References

Villeceysurmad